SURES (Red de Comercio Justo del Sur, South of Chile Fair Trade Network) is a Chilean association created in 2006 during the first Fair Trade Meetings, organized by the Chol-Chol Foundation and the AVINA Foundation. It is a network of small scale producers cooperatives of the Bio-Bio Region and the Araucanía Region, in the south of Chile.

Its mission to enlighten south of Chile’s artisans and use fair trade as a tool to overpass poverty, so that they could live dignified of their work.

Priorities

Producers associated to this network are mostly Mapuche women living within a poor family in the countryside. Selling their products bring them the main income of their home, which is a regular - and at least - minimum wage. SURES also work with urban artisans, the majority of them coming from Concepción.

For all members of SURES, Fair Trade ensures a direct relationship with marginalized producers, which is based on justice and dignity, and non-profit organizations play the part of “matchmaker” between these producers and responsible consumers.

Key principles
Defend and promote fair trade in the south of Chile
Encourage democratic producers’ association
Give value to the Person as much as to the product, thanks to a transparent marketing.

Members
6 associations are part of SURES Network:
Relmu Witral Native Association, made up of 120 Lavkenche women from Tirua, all traditional textile weavers.
Ngen Cooperative, formed of 130 Mapuche women from Curarrehue who created 9 different workshops.
The Chol-Chol Foundation supports almost 200 Mapuche craftswomen and craftsmen from the Araucanía Region.
The Work for a Brother Foundation (TPH) enables artisans from Concepción to promote and sell their products.
Hands of Bío Bío applies itself to creating a place dedicated to craftsmen who are excluded from the main distribution networks.
Ñimi Kafé Pu Domo Native Association regroups 150 women weavers from 6 communities of the Araucanía Region.

See also
Fair Trade
World Fair Trade Organization
Mapuche

External links
Comercio Justo Del Sur
Chol Chol
Relmu Witral

Fair trade organizations